The 2005 Turkish motorcycle Grand Prix was the penultimate round of the 2005 MotoGP Championship. It took place on the weekend of 21–23 October 2005 at the Istanbul Park circuit.

MotoGP classification

250cc classification

125cc classification

Championship standings after the race (motoGP)

Below are the standings for the top five riders and constructors after round sixteen has concluded.

Riders' Championship standings

Constructors' Championship standings

 Note: Only the top five positions are included for both sets of standings.

References

Turkish motorcycle Grand Prix
Turkish
Motorcycle
October 2005 sports events in Turkey